Brent Haygarth and Aleksandar Kitinov were the defending champions, but did not participate together this year.  Haygarth partnered Wayne Ferreira, losing in the first round.  Kitinov did not participate.

Donald Johnson and Piet Norval won in the final 7–6(11–9), 4–6, 7–6(7–4), against Roger Federer and Dominik Hrbatý.

Seeds

Draw

Draw

External links
Draw

2000 ATP Tour
2000 Davidoff Swiss Indoors